Christian Brothers is a 2011 Indian Malayalam language action thriller film directed by Joshiy and written by Udayakrishna and Siby K. Thomas. The film stars Mohanlal, Suresh Gopi, Dileep and R. Sarathkumar. The film features musical score composed by Rajamani and songs by Deepak Dev.

Christian Brothers was released worldwide on 18 March 2011 and had the largest release for a Malayalam language film at that time. The voices for Raai Laxmi, Lakshmi Gopalaswami, and Kaniha was dubbed by Vimmy Mariam George, and Sreeja Ravi dubbed for Kavya Madhavan.

Plot
Palamattathu Varghese Mappila is a wealthy and retired captain from the Indian Army, and has four children named Christy, Jojy, Jessy and Stella. Varghese Mappila is entrusted with an important document pertaining to the transfer of vast amount of land, which was once granted to the Christian missionaries by his younger brother Kochu Thoma, a village officer. Kunnel Kumaran Thampy, a hardcore liquor baron wants to usurp the land for the construction of a resort, where he kills Kochu Thoma for his incorruptible obstinacy and orders to dump his body in a quagmire with his car, where he sets to find the documents. While Varghese was serving in the Army, his children were taken care by a bachelor named Thoma, who takes care of them and buries the absence of motherly affection and care. His brother Jojy left to Italy to study theology, but he travels to London and later opts out after he falls in love with Meenakshi, the daughter of State Home Minister Sudhakaran. Meanwhile, Varghese lodges a missing petition with the cops regarding the prolonged disappearance of his brother.

Past: Christy arrived at Mumbai to work as a senior manager in a bank, where he decided to spend some time with his sister Jessy and her husband George Kutty who were also in Mumbai at the time. Unbeknownst to them, Georgekutty was a pimp, who is also involved in narcotics and extortion. Christy happens to run into a cat and goose chase when George Kutty was targeted by Karim Lala's men. Christy accidentally took the gun from Georgekutty, with which he killed one of the goons during the fight. Christy was imprisoned as the gun carried his fingerprints. When Jessy learns about Georgekutty's true nature, she threatens him to inform Varghese Mappila, but Jessy is killed by Georgekutty. George Kutty misleads the entire family into believing that Christy was the reason for Jessy's death. Since then, Mappila disowns Christy.
 
Present: While returning to India, Meenakshi is kidnapped and the case is assigned to Christy due to his handling experience. Christy learns that Georgekutty has kidnapped Meenakshi and rescues her. The next day, the cops learns that Georgekutty is dead, where they arrest Christy through the assistance of IPS officer Joseph Vadakkan who is handling the case. Joseph Vadakken marries Christy's sister Stella with Christy attending the marriage in secret. Along with his brother-in-law Joseph Vadakkan, Christy helps his brother Jojy and Meenakshi to get married. Later, Joseph tells Varghese  about Christy's innocence responsible. They all return home and Christy reconciles with Varghese. Christy's friend Karim Lala aka Andrews, who was waiting to meet George Kutty (Andrews released Christy earlier when he was imprisoned in Mumbai) assisted him in escaping from prison. It is later revealed that Jojy had killed George Kutty when he learnt about George Kutty's involvement in Jessy's death. At this time, Kunnel Kumaran Thampy, along with his sons and goons barge into Palamattathu steal the property deed from Varghese's locker and hurriedly leaves after fatally shooting Varghese. During the chaos, Thampy reveals the fate of Kochu Thoma, which is later told to Christy by a terribly wounded Varghese. At the hospital, the doctors administer ventilator support to Varghese, as his condition is critical. Enraged about Varghese's plight and the murder of his loving uncle, Christy and his brothers Joseph Vadakkan, Jojy and Andrews kill Kumaran Thampy and his sons

Cast

Production

Development
The film was announced as a big budget film but the Kerala Film Producers Association had set a norm that no Malayalam film should have a budget of more than 3.5 crore. The association refused to give a clearance for the film's shoot. The producers stated that given the star-cast and the subject of the film, it is not possible to make it at a lesser budget. Following the interests from stars, exhibitors and theatre-owners, the film was given a clearance despite its budget, which was many times the restriction set by the association.

Tamil actor Arjun Sarja registered a complaint with Association of Malayalam Movie Artistes (AMMA) about using his name and photographs in connection with the film without his consent or knowledge. Arjun commented that no one has approached him to act in Christian Brothers and all this has happened without his consent or knowledge. However, the issue was resolved when there came an official clarification that Arjun was replaced by actor Sarathkumar in the film.

In February 2010, it was reported that the producers of Christian Brothers excluded actor Thilakan from the film at the request of the Film Employees Federation of Kerala (FEFKA), the predominant film technicians association. Thilakan had been earlier signed for the role played by Sai Kumar in the film. On 3 February 2010, Thilakan publicly protested against the unofficial ban enforced on him by FEFKA. The Association of Malayalam Movie Artists issued a show cause notice to Thilakan for bringing the issue into the public domain. Thilakan accused AMMA, of which he too is a member. Several political parties came out openly in support of Thilakan.

Filming
The film began production on 11 January 2010. First schedule of the film occurred at various locales in Kerala from January through September 2010. Palamattam tharavadu, where the major parts of the film is set was shot from Netto's bungalow near Edakochi. The second schedule, which mainly included picturisation of a song, commenced in London the same month. The principal photography was completed by the end of 2010.

Music 

The soundtrack features four songs composed by Deepak Dev with lyrics by Kaithapram Damodaran Namboothiri. The songs managed to top the music charts in the initial weeks. The soundtrack album was released by Satyam Audios.

Release

Theatrical
The film released worldwide on 18 March 2011 with a total of 400 prints; 157 centres in Kerala, 100 centres outside Kerala and 85 centres overseas, making it the largest release for a Malayalam film at that time.This film beat previous collection records. It was released in the United Kingdom, United States and Australia on 25 March 2011, in Gulf countries on 31 March 2011.

Home media
AP International released the film on DVD and Blu-ray Disc.

Reception

Box office 
Christian Brothers completed 100 days run at theatres. The film grossed  at the box office in two months. Christian Brothers was the highest-grossing Malayalam film of the year. Apart from the box office revenue, the film made  from satellite, overseas and outside Kerala distribution rights.

Critical response
The film received positive reviews praising plot and the performances. Neethu Reghukumar of Bangalore Mirror gave a positive review and said, "The much-anticipated Christian Brothers proved to be worth the wait. Finally fans have something to rejoice as he has made a rollicking start this year. Back in all elements,  all steals the show, firing on all cylinders. However, at no stage the multi-starrer film does appear as a one-man show."

M. Ashitha of Deccan Herald commented, "True, too many cooks spoil the broth. Despite having the luxury of actors like Mohanlal, Suresh Gopi, Dileep and Sarath Kumar together in the movie, Christian Brothers turns out not to be a disappointment. The film, heavily depending on the star power, is a good entertainment." Paresh C. Palicha of Rediff.com stated, "Christian Brothers is a typical multi-starrer that is made with an eye at the box office with not much depth in the subject. But you still get entertained."

Sify.com's reviewer rated the film as a "Racy Entertainer" and stated, "Christian Brothers is a loud and high voltage thriller, for which you don't have to use your brains much. It could have definitely been more enjoyable if it was shorter by some twenty minutes or so, but even in the current form it could make you smile as the end credits start rolling. It's absolutely a no logic-popcorn fun and perhaps not meant to be taken too seriously."

References

External links
 
 
 
 Christian Brothers at Box Office Mojo

Indian action thriller films
Indian gangster films
Indian family films
Films about Christianity
Films shot in Kochi
Films shot in Mumbai
Films shot in London
Fictional portrayals of the Kerala Police
2010s Malayalam-language films
Films directed by Joshiy